A new wagon numbering system was adopted in Indian Railways in 2003. Wagons are allocated 11 digits, making it easy for identification and computerization of a wagon's information. The first two digits indicate Type of Wagon, the third and fourth digits indicate Owning Railway Zone, the fifth and sixth digits indicate Year of Manufacture, the seventh through tenth digits indicate Individual Wagon Number, and the last digit is a Check digit.

First two digits
These two digits indicate Type of Wagon.

Open wagon
Code allotted is from 10 to 29

Covered wagon
Code allotted is from 30 to 39

Tank wagon
Code allotted is from 40 to 54

Flat wagon
Code allotted is from 53 to 69

Hopper wagon
Code allotted is from 70 to 79

Well wagon
Code allotted is from 80 to 84

Brake van
For Brake Van code allotted is from 85 to 89

Third & fourth digits
These two digits indicate the owning railway zone.

Fifth & sixth digits
These two digits indicate the last two digits of the year of manufacture
For example,08 for 200815 for 2015

Seventh to tenth digits
These digits indicate Individual Wagon Number. This is a running serial number from 0001 to 9999.
Numbers 0001 to 0999 are departmental stock.
Numbers 1000 to 9999 are for other traffics stock.

Last digit
This is a Check digit.
The Check Digit for each wagon is calculated using a six-step algorithm as indicated below. 
Let the wagon number be C1 C2 C3 C4 C5 C6 C7 C8 C9 C10 C11. (C1 is the first digit, C2 is the second digit, and so on)
Step  1 : Starting from the left, add all the Characters in the even position.
S1 = C2 + C4 + C6 + C8 + C10
Step  2 : Multiply the sum by 3 to get 3×S1
Step  3 : Starting from the left.. add all the Characters in the odd position.
S2 = C1 + C3 + C5 + C7 + C9
Step  4 : Add the sum of step 2 to the sum of step 3 to get S4= 3×S1+S2
Step  5 : Round this total up to the next multiple of 10.
Step  6 : The check digit is the number required to the added to round up to the next
multiple of 10

An example for the calculation,
Let the wagon number is 31101695215
Step 1 : S1 = C2 + C4 + C6 + C8 + C10 =  1+0+6+5+1 = 13
Step 2 : 3 × S1 = 39
Step 3 : S2 = C1+ C3 + C5 + C7 + C9 = 3+1+1+9+2 = 16
Step 4 : S4= 3 × S1 + S2 = 39 + 16 = 55
Step 5 : Next 10th multiple of 55 = 60
Step 6 : Check digit = 60 - 55 = 5
Hence the eleventh digit is assigned as 5 for this particular wagon.

Abbreviations used for wagon type code
Gauge code
M :- (prefix) MG
N :- (prefix) NG

Wagon type code
B :- (prefix) Bogie wagon (sometimes omitted)
BV :- Brake van
V :- Brake/parcel van (see above for brake van codes)
O :- Open wagon (gondola)
C :- Covered wagon (boxcar)
F :- Flat car
FK :- Flat car for container transport
FU :- Well wagon
LA :- Low flat car with standard buffer height
LB :- Low flat car with low buffer height
LAB :- Low flat car, one end with low buffers, the other with high buffers
R :- Rail-carrying wagon
T :- Tanker (additional letters indicate material carried)
U :- Well wagon
W :- Well wagon
K :- Open wagon: ballast / material / refuse transport (older wagons)
C :- Centre discharge
S :- Side discharge
R :- Rapid (forced) discharge, bottom discharge
X :- Both centre and side discharge
X :- (also) High sided
Y :- Low (medium) side walls
L :- Low sided
H :- Heavy load

The ‘B’ indication is sometimes omitted as all new wagons are bogie stock.

Following the type code in the classification code a letter may denote the type of coupler, nowadays optional, as all new freight cars are fitted with centre buffer couplers (CBC). An 'N' suffix is for 'pneumatic', or air-braked wagons. Most newer stock that is air-braked also has CBC couplers, so the 'C' is usually dropped. E.g., BOXN for air-braked BOX wagons, not BOXCN. Almost all the older stock is vacuum-braked.

Coupler, brake, and other suffixes
C :- Centre buffer coupler (CBC)
R :- Screw coupling only
T :- Transition coupler (CBC with additional side buffers and screw coupling)
N :- Air-braked
M :- (suffix) Military

Gallery of Different Wagon Types

References

Railway coaches of India
Rail transport operations